Maria (Masha) Alexandrovna Kolenkina (1850 – 31 Oct 1926) was a Russian socialist revolutionary from a merchant family in Temryuk, a small town on the Sea of Azov. While studying to be a midwife in Kyiv in the early 1870s, she became part of the populist movement in Russia. She went "to the people" in 1874 to propagandise and later belonged to Bakunist socialists known as the Southern Rebels (Iuzhnye Buntari) in Kyiv. She was subsequently associated with the Land and Liberty movement in Saint Petersburg.

Together with Vera Zasulich she planned what was in posterity seen as the first modern terrorist act, to assassinate two Russian government officials on 24 January 1878. Her attempt to assassinate Vladislav Zhelekhovskii, the prosecutor in the Trial of the 193, failed, while Zasulich succeeded in injuring the governor of St. Petersburg, Fyodor Trepov. After a gun fight, the Russian gendarmes arrested Kolenkina on 11 October 1878, and she was sentenced to 10 years of hard labor and internal exile to Siberia.

Bibliography
 Jay Bergman. Vera Zasulich: A Biography, Stanford University Press, 1983, 261p.
 EK Breshko-Breshkovskai͡a͡, L Hutchinson, Hidden springs of the Russian revolution: personal memoirs of Katerina Breshkovskaia, Stanford University Press, 1931.
 Ana Siljak.  Angel of Vengeance: The "Girl Assassin," the Governor of St. Petersburg, and Russia's Revolutionary World, St. Martin's Press, 2008, 370p. 
 Five Sisters: Women Against the Tsar, eds. Barbara A. Engel, Clifford N. Rosenthal, Routledge, 1975, reprinted in 1992, pp. 61–62.
 Franco Venturi, Roots of Revolution. A History of the Populist and Socialist Movements in Nineteenth Century Russia (1960). Weidenfeld and Nicolson. London.

Notes

1850 births
1926 deaths
Revolutionaries from the Russian Empire
Russian socialists